The Fairmont Golden Prague Hotel is a 9-story, 372-room hotel on the bank of the Vltava River, near the Old Town, in Prague, Czech Republic. It is managed by Fairmont Hotels.

History
The hotel opened in 1974 as the Inter-Continental Praha, and was later slightly renamed as the InterContinental Prague. It was designed by noted Czech architect Karel Filsak in the Brutalist style, and was constructed by the Czech national travel firm ČEDOK from 1968 to 1974. The hotel was owned by bank funds from 1990 to 1999, during the privatization process. It was renovated in 1992–1995, overseen by architect Roman Koucký. Strategic Hotels & Resorts purchased the property in 1999. The interior was renovated in 2002, though certain original elements by designer Miloslav Hejný were preserved.

Westmont Hospitality Group purchased the hotel in 2010. They sold it in 2013 to the Slovak-based Best Hotel Properties, owned by investment firm J&T. It was sold again, in December 2018, to R2G, the investment group of Czech billionaire Oldřich Šlemr. The hotel was renamed the Golden Prague Hotel managed by Fairmont in May 2020, before closing for a major renovation. It will reopen in 2024 as the Fairmont Golden Prague.

Gallery

References

Prague
Buildings and structures in Prague
Brutalist architecture in the Czech Republic
InterContinental hotels
Hotels established in 1974
Hotel buildings completed in 1974
1974 establishments in Czechoslovakia
20th-century architecture in the Czech Republic